Dave Siciliano (born July 1946) is a Canadian former ice hockey coach and player. He played university hockey for the Lakehead Nor'Westers, and led them to the International Collegiate Hockey Association championship as the most valuable player in the 1966–67 season. As the player-coach for the Thunder Bay Twins, his team won both the United States Hockey League (USHL) playoffs and the 1975 Allan Cup as the Canadian senior champions. He served as head coach of the Thunder Bay Flyers from 1986 to 1993, where he won four regular season titles, and two playoffs championships, and two Centennial Cups as Canadian junior champions. He was a coach for the Canada men's under-18 team at the Phoenix Cup in 1987 and 1991, and for the Canada men's junior team which won gold at the 1993 World Juniors.

Siciliano was the first coach of the Edmonton Ice when the team was established for the 1996–97 Western Hockey League season, then was coach and general manager of the Owen Sound Platers in the Ontario Hockey League from 1997 to 2000. He returned to the USHL as coach and general manager of the Sioux City Musketeers from 2000 to 2008. He led them to a playoffs championship in 2002, and had the second most career victories for a coach in the USHL when he retired. He was named Coach of the Year in three USHL seasons, and received the league's Distinguished Service Award in 2009. The Canadian Amateur Hockey Association named him the recipient of the Gordon Juckes Award in 1987, for contributions to amateur hockey in Canada. He was twice inducted into the Wall of Fame at Lakehead University, and was inducted into the builder category of the Northwestern Ontario Sports Hall of Fame in 1995.

Early life and playing career

Dave Siciliano was born in July 1946, in Thunder Bay, Ontario, in a family of Italian Canadians. He grew up in Thunder Bay, was a right-handed centreman, and played junior ice hockey with the Fort William Canadians.

In university, Siciliano played three seasons for the Lakehead Nor'Westers from 1966 to 1969, and served as the team captain. He was coached by Hank Akervall and played on the same forward line with Dwight Stirrett and Murray Smith each season, which became known as the "S-line". The 1966–67 Lakehead team won the International Collegiate Hockey Association (ICHA) championship, and Siciliano led the association in points scored. In three seasons playing for Lakehead, Siciliano scored 54 goals and 102 assists.

Siciliano graduated from Lakehead University with a Bachelor of Arts degree in 1969, then played senior ice hockey for the Fort William Beavers during the 1969–70 season. He later completed his Master of Physical Education degree from Northern Michigan University, while playing the 1970–71 season with the Marquette Iron Rangers as a graduate student.

Coaching career

1971 to 1980
Siciliano was a player-coach for HIFK Hockey in Finland in during the 1971–72 SM-sarja season. He led the team to a third-place finish with 18 wins in 32 games, winning the league's bronze medal. He returned to Canada for the 1972–73 season, and played for the Thunder Bay Twins coached by Lee Fogolin Sr. The Twins placed first overall during the United States Hockey League (USHL) regular season.

Siciliano returned to coaching full-time with the Thunder Bay Hurricanes during the 1973–74 season in the Thunder Bay Junior A Hockey League. His team completed the regular season in first place with 45 wins in 60 games. In the 1974 Centennial Cup playoffs, the Hurricanes defeated the Wexford Raiders four games to three in the first round, then were defeated four games to three by the Smiths Falls Bears in the second round.

In the 1974–75 season, Siciliano served as a player-coach for the Thunder Bay Twins in the USHL. He led the team to 36 wins in 48 games, and a second-place finish in the Northern Division. He felt that goaltending would make a difference in the playoffs, and that his team played best against the stronger teams in the USHL. The Twins defeated the first-place Green Bay Bobcats two games to none in a best-of-three series in the first round of the playoffs. Siciliano credited his team's defensive and positional play for winning the series. The Twins won the final round of the playoffs with three consecutive wins versus Waterloo Black Hawks in a best-of-five series for the USHL championship.

The Twins had chosen not to participate in the 1975 Allan Cup playoffs for the Canadian senior hockey championship due to scheduling conflicts with the USHL playoffs. After the St. Boniface Mohawks appealed for reconsideration, the Twins entered the Allan Cup playoffs upon the conclusion of the USHL playoffs, then won the series versus the Mohawks. In the Western Canada finals, the Twins won the best-of-five series with three consecutive victories versus the Spokane Flyers. The Twins scored five goals in the last 25 minutes of the decisive third game, including the winning goal scored with six seconds remaining. In a best-of-seven series for the national championship, Siciliano and the Twins won the Allan Cup by defeating the defending champion Barrie Flyers four games to two. The Twins then withdrew from the USHL due to travel costs and schedule commitments to represent Canada on a European tour in the 1975–76 season.

Siciliano's USHL player rights were drafted by the Traverse City Bays, but he chose to retire from playing to coach full-time. After he completed his level five certification from the National Hockey Coaches School in 1975; he then conducted coaching clinics on behalf of the Canadian Amateur Hockey Association (CAHA), and operated power skating and hockey schools in Thunder Bay.

From 1975 to 1980, Siciliano was the athletic director at Lakehead University, and head coach of the Lakehead Nor'Westers which played in the Great Plains Athletic Conference (GPAC) as part of Canadian university men's hockey. He coached the Nor'Westers to the GPAC championship finals during the 1977–78 season, but lost the best-of-three series versus the Regina Cougars by two games to one. Siciliano represented Lakehead University at the Canadian Interuniversity Athletics Union meeting in June 1979, which voted against financial aid or scholarships to student athletes. He felt that the decision would lead to under-the-table offers to students in lieu of legitimate financial support.

Thunder Bay Flyers
Siciliano served as head coach of the Thunder Bay Flyers in the USHL from 1986 to 1993. He led the team to 35 wins and a second-place finish during the 1986–87 season. After defeating the Sioux City Musketeers in the first round of the playoffs, the Flyers lost three games to two versus the Madison Capitols in the second round.

The Flyers won 40 games and placed first overall in the 1987–88 season, which gave Siciliano his first Anderson Cup as the USHL's regular season champion. Despite that his team had 13 rookies, the Flyers had the highest scoring offence in the league and the second best goals against average. The Ottawa Citizen credited the team's success to its skating ability, puck control and aggressive forechecking. The Flyers defeated the Madison Capitols by three games to one in the first round of the playoffs, then defeated the Rochester Mustangs by three games to one in the finals to win the Clark Cup as USHL playoffs champions. The Flyers then participated in the Dudley Hewitt Cup playoffs to determine the Central Canada "Junior A" champion, and lost to the Pembroke Lumber Kings in four consecutive games in the final series. Since the Lumber Kings hosted the 1988 Centennial Cup tournament to determine the Canadian Junior A champion and received an automatic berth, the Flyers advanced to the Centennial Cup tournament as the Dudley Hewitt Cup finalists. The tournament was the first appearance for the Flyers at the Centennial Cup, which saw them lose all three games played and finish in fourth place.

Siciliano led the Flyers to 40 wins and placed first overall in the 1988–89 season, to win his second Anderson Cup. In the USHL playoffs, the Flyers defeated the Omaha Lancers in three games in the first round, then defeated the North Iowa Huskies in four games in the second round, then defeated the St. Paul Vulcans in five games to give Siciliano his second Clark Cup championship. The Flyers began the Canadian playoffs undefeated in eight games with series victories versus the Sudbury Cubs and the Pembroke Lumber Kings to give Siciliano his first Dudley Hewitt Cup. Siciliano recalled that the Flyers were not given respect in advance of the 1989 Centennial Cup, and said that "the host Summerside team commented at the coaches press conference that Thunder Bay couldn't be very strong since they played in an American-based league". During the round-robin stage of the tournament, the Flyers earned wins versus the Vernon Lakers and Moncton Hawks, and lost to the Summerside Western Capitals. The Flyers earned a berth in the cup finals based on goal difference among three teams tied for first place, then defeated Summerside by a 4–1 score in the final game to win the Centennial Cup. Siciliano summarized the game by saying, "our team speed and skill over powered Summerside and we were unfazed by the full house and their physical play"; and "believe[d] that team was one of the best junior teams to ever represent Thunder Bay". The Centennial Cup championship was the first for both Siciliano and for any team from Northwestern Ontario.

The Flyers won 31 games and placed third overall in the 1989–90 season. They defeated the St. Paul Vulcans in three games in the first round of the playoffs then were defeated three games to two by the Rochester Mustangs in the semifinals. In the Dudley Hewitt Cup playoffs, the Flyers lost 4 games to 2 versus the Sudbury Cubs in the semifinals.

Siciliano won his third Anderson Cup when the Flyers placed first overall in the 1990–91 season with 36 wins. In the playoffs, the Flyers defeated the North Iowa Huskies in three games in the quarterfinals, defeated the Dubuque Fighting Saints in three games in the semifinals, then lost by three games to one versus the Omaha Lancers in the Clark Cup finals. The Flyers reached the finals of the Dudley Hewitt Cup playoffs versus the Sudbury Cubs, which guaranteed them a berth in the 1991 Centennial Cup tournament since Sudbury was scheduled to host the upcoming national finals. Despite missing four players including their goaltender due to suspensions, the Flyers defeated Sudbury by a 5–1 score to give Siciliano his second Dudley Hewitt Cup championship. In his third appearance at the Centennial Cup tournament, the Flyers placed fifth with one win in four games.

The Flyers won 36 games and placed first overall in the 1991–92 season to give Siciliano his fourth Anderson Cup. In the playoffs, the Flyers defeated the Rochester Mustangs in three consecutive games, then lost by three games to one versus the Dubuque Fighting Saints in the semifinals. The Flyers hosted the 1992 Dudley Hewitt Cup tournament in Thunder Bay. They placed second during the round-robin, defeated the Joliette Nationals by a 5–2 score in the semifinals, then defeated the Kanata Valley Lasers by a 5–1 score in the finals, which gave Siciliano his third Dudley Hewitt Cup. At the 1992 Centennial Cup, the Flyers completed the round-robin with two wins and two losses, then defeated the Halifax Mooseheads by an 8–1 score to reach the finals versus the Winkler Flyers. Siciliano recalled in a 2021 interview that, Winkler was "a bigger and more physical team and wanted to wear their black sweaters" as an intimidation tactic. As the home team with the first choice of colours, Siciliano's Flyers wore dark red jerseys and forced Winkler to change into light-coloured jerseys. Siciliano felt that worked in his team's favour as Winkler took penalties early in the game, and his team won by a 10-1 score giving Siciliano a second Centennial Cup championship.

The Flyers placed fourth overall in the 1992–93 season, defeated the St. Paul Vulcans by three games to two in the first round of the playoffs, then were defeated three games to one by the Omaha Lancers in the second round. In the Dudley Hewitt Cup playoffs, the Flyers reached the semifinals but lost to the Chateauguay Elites. Siciliano resigned as coach of the Flyers after the 1992–93 season, but remained as the team's general manager for the next two seasons.

The Flyers placed sixth overall in the 1993–94 season, lost in the first round of the USHL playoffs in six games to the Omaha Lancers, and were runners-up to the Chateauguay Elites in the Dudley Hewitt Cup finals. The Flyers placed fifth overall in the 1994–95 season, and lost in six games to the Sioux City Musketeers in the first round of the playoffs. After Siciliano won his fourth Dudley Hewitt Cup when the Flyers defeated the Brampton Capitals in the championship game, his team lost to the Calgary Canucks in the 1995 Centennial Cup semifinals.

Canadian national teams
Siciliano was the general manager of an Ontario all-star team in the midget age group which played against a touring Soviet Union team, in a program overseen by the CAHA to identify prospect players for the Canada men's national team in ice hockey at the 1988 Winter Olympics. He served as assistant coach of the Canada men's national under-18 team at the Phoenix Cup in 1987, then was head coach of Canada's under-18 team which won the silver medal at the 1991 Phoenix Cup in Japan. He was an assistant coach to Perry Pearn with the Canada men's national junior team which won gold at the 1993 World Junior Ice Hockey Championships in Sweden.

Edmonton Ice
On January 16, 1996, Siciliano was announced as the first head coach for the Edmonton Ice, an expansion team in the Western Hockey League. He signed a two-year contract, and had previously declined offers from the Red Deer Rebels, the Michigan Tech Huskies team, and the Italy men's national team. Siciliano and team owner Ed Chynoweth, were committed to building a relationship between the Edmonton Ice and the local minor hockey program.

The Edmonton Ice completed the 1996–97 season with 14 wins in 72 games, placed last overall in the league, and did not qualify for the playoffs. When the team began the 1997–98 season with nine losses and one tie, Siciliano was fired on October 24, 1997, and replaced by assistant coach Ryan McGill. During Siciliano's tenure, the Edmonton Ice lost 31 games by a one-goal margin.

Owen Sound Platers
On November 25, 1997, Siciliano was named the coach and general manager of the Owen Sound Platers in the Ontario Hockey League. He declined two coaching offers from the Western Professional Hockey League, and opted to take charge of the Platers who had a record of 9–12–1 with coach John Lovell. The Platers completed the 1997–98 season with 27 wins in 66 games, and placed fourth in the Central Division. In the playoffs, the Platers won the first round four games to two versus the Kitchener Rangers, then lost in the second round four games to one versus the Ottawa 67's.

Siciliano led the Platers to 39 wins in 68 games during the 1998–99 season, and a third-place finish in the Western Conference. In the playoffs, the Platers won the first round four games to one versus the Sault Ste. Marie Greyhounds, won the second round four games to two versus the Guelph Storm, then lost in the third round four games to one versus the London Knights. The 1998–99 season marked the first time which the Platers advanced to the third round of the playoffs during the franchise's history in Owen Sound.

The Platers began the 1999–2000 season with a record of 11–26–3–4, and were last place in the Midwest Division. Siciliano was fired on January 15, 2000, and replaced by his assistant coach Brian O'Leary.

Sioux City Musketeers

The Sioux City Musketeers of the USHL named Siciliano as head coach and general manager to succeed Dave Hakstol on June 26, 2000. Sioux City radio station KOOL 99.5 broadcast The Dave Siciliano Show on Mondays during the season, which included interviews with the coach and the team's players. He promised that his team would be in better physical condition and to outwork their opponents. The Musketeers placed fifth in the West Division during the 2000–01 season, and lost in the first round of the playoffs in three consecutive games to the Lincoln Stars.

Siciliano led the Musketeers to 41 wins and a third-place finish in the West Division during the 2001–02 season, which included a 16-game winning streak, and 33 wins in 37 games played on home ice. In the playoffs, the Musketeers defeated the Sioux Falls Stampede in three consecutive games in the first round, defeated the Green Bay Gamblers in four games in the second round, then defeated the Omaha Lancers three games to two in the playoffs finals. The victory gave Siciliano his third Clark Cup coaching the playoffs champions of the USHL. At the start of the season, Siciliano had not expected to reach the finals nor win the cup, but credited the team for being tight-knit and "just great quality kids" who handled adversity. During the fifth game of the finals, the Musketeers trailed by a 3–1 score in the third period, then tied up the game in the final six minutes and won in overtime. In a 2008 interview, Siciliano recalled that the Clark Cup victory in 2002 was his fondest memory with the team.

The Musketeers placed third in the West Division with 36 wins during the 2002–03 season, and lost to the River City Lancers three games to one in the first round of the playoffs. Siciliano improved the Musketeers to 38 wins and a second-place finish in the West Division in the 2003–04 season. They defeated the River City Lancers in three games in the first round of the playoffs, then where defeated by the Tri-City Storm in four games in the second round.

Siciliano led the Musketeers to 37 wins and a second-place finish in the West Division during the 2004–05 season. In the playoffs, the Musketeers won the first round by three games to one versus the Lincoln Stars, and won the second round by three games to one versus the Tri-City Storm. Each of Siciliano's three Clark Cups as of 2005 had been won by a victory in the opposing team's rink, and he attempted to win a fourth on the road in Cedar Rapids, Iowa. The Cedar Rapids RoughRiders won the Clark Cup in the fifth and deciding game by a 4–1 score. Siciliano credited his team for not quitting despite the strong play of opposing goaltender Alex Stalock.

The Musketeers placed fifth in the West Division with 28 wins in the 2005–06 season, and did not qualify for the playoffs. Siciliano improved the Musketeers to 34 wins despite placing fifth again in the West Division in the 2006–07 season. In the playoffs, the Musketeers were defeated four games to three by the Tri-City Storm in the first round.

Siciliano withdrew his name from consideration to coach the men's hockey team at Lakehead University, and returned to the Musketeers for the 2007–08 season. He led the team to 32 wins and a fourth-place finish in the West Division, then lost to the Omaha Lancers three games to one in the first round of the playoffs. On April 1, 2008, Siciliano resigned from the Musketeers after eight years as coach and general manager. He had the second most career victories for a coach in the USHL at the time, and had the most wins for a Musketeers coach with 272 victories. The Sioux City Journal credited Siciliano for having "etched a distinct signature on Musketeer ice success for eight seasons". He reflected on his time with the Musketeers by saying, "coaching in Sioux City has been a wonderful experience, one of my best in hockey". He was also proud of designing the team's circular dressing room at the Gateway Arena, where players could "look [their] teammates directly in the eye".

Coaching statistics
Career coaching statistics:

NOTE: Thunder Bay teams in the USHL participated in both the league's playoffs and the Canadian championship playoffs.

Later hockey career
After retiring from coaching in 2008, Siciliano worked for the hockey operations department of the USHL. In September 2016, he was named a senior advisor to the Superior International Junior Hockey League. He mentored the leagues coaches, assisted with the scouting and development of players, and disciplinary reviews.

Honours and awards

Playing for the Lakehead Nor'Westers, Siciliano was named an ICHA all-star in all three seasons, twice was named a National Association of Intercollegiate Athletics All-American, and was named the ICHA most valuable player for the 1966–67 season.

The CAHA named Siciliano the recipient of the Gordon Juckes Award in 1987, in recognition of contributions to development of amateur hockey at the national level in Canada. He was named the USHL Coach of the Year in the 1986–87, 1988–89 and 1990–91 seasons; and was named a third team all-star coach for the 1998–99 Ontario Hockey League season.

Siciliano was inducted into the builder category of the Northwestern Ontario Sports Hall of Fame in 1995. He was inducted into the Lakehead Thunderwolves Wall of Fame in 1999 as a member of the 1966–67 men's hockey team, and inducted again in 2007 as a member of the "S-line" with Dwight Stirrett and Murray Smith. The USHL recognized Siciliano's career with the Distinguished Service Award in 2009.

Personal life
Siciliano is married to Carol Siciliano. She was head of Thunder Bay's adult education program until 1996, then oversaw the player housing program for the Musketeers, and the school reading program involving players from the Musketeers. The Sicilianos have one son and one daughter. Their son Mark played as a defenceman on the 1992 Centennial Cup championship team.

Siciliano worked as a recreation leadership instructor at Confederation College beginning in 1972, was manager of the Canada Games Complex in Thunder Bay from 1980 to 1993, then was general manager of the Thunder Bay Community Services Department from 1993 to 1996. He coached the Thunder Bay Kings AAA bantam team to the Ontario championship during the 1995–96 season, and coached the AAA midget team from 2008 to 2010. He was president of the Northwestern Ontario Sports Hall of Fame as of 2016, and chairman of the board of directors for the Thunder Bay International Airports Authority as of 2021.

Notes

References

1946 births
Living people
20th-century Canadian people
21st-century Canadian people
Academics of physical education and sport
Athletic directors
Canadian exercise instructors
Canadian ice hockey centres
Canadian ice hockey coaches
Canadian people of Italian descent
Edmonton Ice coaches
HIFK (ice hockey) players
Ice hockey people from Ontario
Ice hockey player-coaches
Lakehead Thunderwolves players
Marquette Iron Rangers players
Northern Michigan University alumni
Owen Sound Platers coaches
Sportspeople from Thunder Bay
Superior International Junior Hockey League
United States Hockey League coaches